Talking Rain is a privately held beverage company based in Preston, Washington that manufactures still and sparkling waters. Sparkling Ice accounts for the majority of their business.

History
 
Talking Rain was founded in 1987 by John Stevens and Pete Hiskin in Bellevue, Washington. The company was bought 6 months later by investors Lawrence Hebner, Donald Kline, and Donald Jasper for $300,000. In 1992, the company began production of Sparkling Ice. They also moved to their current location in Preston, Washington that same year.

In 1997 the company changed their sweetener to sucralose, becoming the first US beverage company to do so.

In 2014, Kevin Durant, the former Oklahoma City Thunder forward, signed an endorsement deal with Sparkling Ice under Roc Nation Sports.

In 2014, 2015 and 2016 the company was recognized in the Inc. 5000 list.

In August 2017, Talking Rain signed a distribution agreement with Tata Global Beverages to distribute Himalayan mineral water in the U.S.

In 2018, Talking Rain launched a rebranded bottle label and changed the Sparkling Ice formula to include colors from natural sources.

Kevin Klock was president and CEO of the company from 2010 to 2017; he left abruptly after alleged accusations of sexual harassment by a former Talking Rain employee. Later, the matter was resolved, and the case was dismissed. Marcus Smith was interim CEO until April 2018, when Chris Hall took over the position, and Smith became president of the company.

In 2018 at 34th annual NHRA Arizona Nationals, Talking Rain announced a yearlong sponsorship of the NHRA Top Fuel Dragster driven by Leah Pritchett.

In January 2019, company introduced voice skill for Google Assistant and Amazon Alexa for consumers to check Sparking Ice cocktail and mocktail recipes.

According to Nielsen, as of June 15, 2019 Sparkling Ice had about $500 million in annual retail sales with a 14.9% increase in year-to-date dollar sales.

In July 2021, Adam Lapp was promoted to Senior Vice President of Sales, Nina Morrison to Senior Vice President of Community Experience, and Ken Sylvia was promoted to Chief Operating Officer. 

In April 2022, COO Ken Sylvia was promoted to CEO.

Talking Rain launched the “Live in Full Flavor” advertising campaign in 2022 to celebrate life’s flavors every day.

Philanthropy 
Talking Rain launched a national campaign, Cheers to Heroes, in May 2020 to bring recognition to America’s hometown heroes by asking consumers to nominate a friend, peer, co-worker, or neighbor who is considered an everyday hero. to win cash prizes. Gabby Douglas led the campaign that nominated men and women who put their own lives at risk to go to work and serve the public during the COVID-19 pandemic. Similarly, Chris Hall announced Sparkling Ice Cheers to You Beautification Project where Talking Rain will spend $250,000 across Summerville, South Carolina; Hopkinsville, Kentucky and Bedford, Texas for the restoration of the public spaces. The second annual Sparkling Ice Cheers to Heroes campaign was announced in April 2021 to honor and celebrate America’s everyday heroes. The third annual Cheers to Heroes campaign was launched in April 2022 to honor and celebrate America's Veteran heroes.

In March 2022 Talking Rain and the city of Biloxi teamed up to unveil new playground equipment at St. Mary’s Park in Biloxi.

Sustainability 
In January 2021 Talking Rain collaborated with Terrapass and purchased carbon offsets to address scope 1 and 2 emissions by funding more than 28,000 metric tons of carbon reduction to address its natural gas use and fleet emissions in the United States.

In March 2020 Talking Rain joined The Recycling Partnership, an environmental nonprofit based in Falls Church, Virginia, to promote consumer recycling education and sending more quality recyclables back into the circular economy.

Products
In 2006, they launched two more products, Twist and ActivWater, which were produced until 2011, when Talking Rain decided to focus their business on the Sparkling Ice; this year,  Talking Rain generated $60 million in revenue, up 140% from the year before. In 2013, the beverage represented 95% of the company's sales.

In October 2018, Talking Rain released a caffeinated version of Sparkling Ice.

In May 2020, the company launched an alkaline water, Talking Rain Essentials Hydration Water in collaboration with Waterboys which was relaunched in 2021 as Talking Rain AQA™. It was relaunched under a new name as Talking Rain AQA in 2021.

In 2020, Talking Rain announced the hybrid sports drink Talking Rain Essentials (TRE) and released a new hard seltzer beverage, Sparkling Ice Spiked in August 2020.

In June 2021 Sparkling Ice Superfruit, the brand’s first non-alcoholic line extension that is sweetened with Stevia leaf was introduced which contains vitamin B, C, and D.

Talking Rain launched cocktail-inspired hard seltzers Sparkling Ice Spiked Cocktails in February 2022.

References

External links
 Talking Rain Beverage Company home page

Drink companies of the United States
American soft drinks
Companies based in King County, Washington
Food and drink companies based in Washington (state)
Food and drink companies established in 1987
1987 establishments in Washington (state)